The 2004–2005 Liga Alef season saw Maccabi Tzur Shalom (champions of the North Division) and Hapoel Bnei Lod (champions of the South Division) winning the title and promotion to 2005–06.

At the bottom, Hapoel Tuba, Maccabi Tur'an (from North division), Hapoel Qalansawe and Hapoel Jaljulia (from South division) were all automatically relegated to Liga Bet.

North Division

South Division

Relegation play-offs

North play-off
The 12th placed club in Liga Alef North, Maccabi Shefa-'Amr, faced Liga Bet North A and North B runners-up, Hapoel Karmiel and Hapoel Umm al-Fahm. The teams played each other in a round-robin tournament, with all matches held at a neutral venue, Nahariya Municipal Stadium.

Hapoel Umm al-Fahm won the play-offs and was promoted to Liga Alef. Maccabi Shefa-'Amr remained in Liga Alef after Hapoel Majd al-Krum (which relegated from Liga Artzit to Liga Alef) folded during the summer.

South play-off
The 12th placed club in Liga Alef South, Beitar Giv'at Ze'ev, faced Liga Bet South A and Liga Bet South B runners-up, Hapoel Azor and Ironi Nes Tziona. The teams played each other in a round-robin tournament, with all matches held at a neutral venue, Bat Yam Municipal Stadium.

Ironi Nes Tziona won the play-offs and was promoted to Liga Alef. Beitar Giv'at Ze'ev remained in Liga Alef after a vacancy was created in the South division, following the merger of Liga Artzit club, Maccabi Ramat Amidar, with Hakoah Ramat Gan.

References
Liga Alef 04/05, walla.co.il

Liga Alef seasons
4
Israel